Ergens in Nederland  (internationally known as Somewhere in the Netherlands) is a 1940 Dutch film directed by Ludwig Berger with the support of the Royal Dutch Navy.

Cast
 Lily Bouwmeester as Nellie van Loon
 Jan de Hartog as lawyer Frans van Loon, Nellie's husband
 Fien de la Mar as a society lady
 Cruys Voorbergh as the actor Erik Detmar
 Matthieu van Eysden as Beyer, the driver
 Max Croiset		
 Rini Otte
 Eduard Verkade as an old music teacher
 Piet Köhler		
 Aaf Bouber (as Aaf Bouber-ten Hoope) as the Zeelandic farmer
 Chris Baay		
 Harry Boda

External links 
 

1940 films
Dutch black-and-white films
War romance films
Dutch war films
Dutch romance films
1940s war films
1940s romance films
Dutch World War II films
1940s Dutch-language films
Films directed by Ludwig Berger